John Mulhall may refer to:
 John Mulhall (hurler)
 John Mulhall (footballer)
 John Mulhall (gymnast)